Mashori Sharif railway station is  located in  Pakistan.

See also
 List of railway stations in Pakistan
 Pakistan Railways

References

Railway stations in Larkana District
Railway stations on Kotri–Attock Railway Line (ML 2)